Il Monello (meaning The Rascal in English) was a weekly comic magazine for kids and teens published in Italy from 1933 to 1990.

History and profile 
Il Monello was founded in 1933 by the Del Duca brothers and initially offered only works by Italian cartoonists, introducing several American comic series just in 1936. The magazine was published weekly and was based in Milan.

Considered a mix between Corriere dei Piccoli and Jumbo, Il Monello ceased publication in 1939 and many of its interrupted series continued on another Del Duca's magazine for kids, Intrepido. After a 14-year hiatus, Il Monello resumed publication in 1953, achieving a significant commercial success thanks to adventure series such as Forza John and Rocky Rider and to several humorous comic strips, notably Pedrito el Drito and Superbone. Since the early 1970s the magazine targeted a more mature audience and started  including regular columns on sport, music and entertainment. The weekly had a circulation of 231,992 copies in 1984.

In 1989 it changed its name on Monello Okay!, then it finally closed in October 1990.

See also
 List of magazines published in Italy

Notes

1933 establishments in Italy
1933 comics debuts
1990 comics endings
1990 disestablishments in Italy
Children's magazines published in Italy
Comics magazines published in Italy
Defunct magazines published in Italy
Italian-language magazines
Magazines about comics
Magazines established in 1933
Magazines disestablished in 1990
Magazines published in Milan
Weekly magazines published in Italy